Norbert Michelisz (born 8 August 1984) is a Hungarian auto racing driver and the 2019 winner of the World Touring Car Cup.

Career

Early career 
Michelisz was the 2006 Hungarian Suzuki Swift Cup champion, and in 2007 he won the Hungarian Renault Clio Cup.

In 2008 he competed in the Hungarian SEAT León Supercup, where he finished as runner-up. He drove in the SEAT León Eurocup, winning one race at Monza, and finishing 14th overall. The win in the SEAT León Eurocup led to a drive in the FIA World Touring Car Championship, competing in two rounds at Okayama for the SEAT backed SUNRED Engineering team. After retiring in race one, he finished sixteenth in the second race.

In 2009 he was the best scorer in the León Eurocup round at Porto, winning WTCC participation at Brands Hatch. He went on to win the León Eurocup title in September. This won him a drive for SEAT Sport in a SEAT León TDI at the 2009 European Touring Car Cup. He scored pole position and won the first race, but finished the second race in fifth, meaning he finished third in the overall standings, behind established touring car drivers James Thompson and Franz Engstler.

2010-2017: World Touring Car Championship (WTCC) 

In 2010 he completed his first full season with SEAT León TDI in Zengő-Dension Team. He gained his first podium at Okayama in Race 1 after disqualification of Andy Priaulx and Augusto Farfus. Last race of the season he won his maiden victory in WTCC at Macau. He finished 9th in the championship with 104 points. He won the Rookie Challenge in that year.

In 2011 he switched to a BMW 320 TC with his Zengő-Dension Team. He scored his only podium finish in the season at Hungaroring. In both races he posted fastest lap. In overall he was 9th again with 88 points.

In 2012 he took his first win since the Race of Macau in 2010, and his first win with the BMW. He was victorious in Race 2 of Race of Hungary, in front of his home crowd.

On 18 November 2012, after the last race (Macau) he won the Yokohama Trophy (Independent Championship) with Zengő Motorsport team, achieving the most significant victory in the history of Hungarian motor racing.

Zengő Motorsport switched to Honda for 2013, Michelisz stayed with the Hungarian squad until the end of 2015 – he won twice during this time: in 2013, he took victory at Honda's home track, Suzuka Circuit, two years later, he was a winner again at the Hungaroring.

On 13 January 2016, Honda announced Michelisz as factory driver alongside Rob Huff and Tiago Monteiro.  The Himesháza-born driver was victorious in Japan for the second time; then he finished fourth in the standings. Next year, he became a championship protagonist, but got defeated by Cyan Racing's Thed Björk in a dramatic final weekend in Qatar.

2018- : World Touring Car Cup 
After the 2017 season, WTCC became World Touring Car Cup following the merge with TCR International Series.  On 30 January 2018, it was announced that Michelisz would join to BRC Racing Team's Hyundai team as Gabriele Tarquini's team-mate.  His only win of the year was clinched at Slovakia Ring, he was fourth in the championship while helping Tarquini to become the first WTCR champion.

In 2019, he continued his career with BRC and Hyundai.  After a couple of races, he became a real challenger by taking five wins and 10 podium finishes during the season. In a thrilling final at Sepang, he was crowned as champion after defeating Münnich Motorsport's and Honda's Esteban Guerrieri.

Racing record

Complete World Touring Car Championship results
(key) (Races in bold indicate pole position) (Races in italics indicate fastest lap)

† Driver did not finish the race, but was classified as he completed over 90% of the race distance.

Complete International Superstars Series results
(key) (Races in bold indicate pole position) (Races in italics indicate fastest lap)

Complete TCR International Series results
(key) (Races in bold indicate pole position) (Races in italics indicate fastest lap)

† Driver did not finish the race, but was classified as he completed over 75% of the race distance.

Complete World Touring Car Cup results
(key) (Races in bold indicate pole position) (Races in italics indicate fastest lap)

† Driver did not finish the race, but was classified as he completed over 90% of the race distance.

Complete TCR Europe Touring Car Series results
(key) (Races in bold indicate pole position) (Races in italics indicate fastest lap)

References

External links

1984 births
Living people
Hungarian racing drivers
SEAT León Eurocup drivers
Superstars Series drivers
European Touring Car Cup drivers
World Touring Car Championship drivers
World Touring Car Champions
World Touring Car Cup drivers
Sportspeople from Baranya County
Hyundai Motorsport drivers
Cupra Racing drivers
Boutsen Ginion Racing drivers
Zengő Motorsport drivers
Engstler Motorsport drivers
TCR Europe Touring Car Series drivers